The Sri Lanka Police Academy is the central training institution for police recruits and police officers of the Sri Lanka Police. It is located in Dehiwala, approximately 11 km south of Colombo City. The academy was established in 2008, with the Police Higher Training Institute and the In-Service Training Division will be repealed and converted to its divisions.

Affiliated institutes

The following institutes are affiliated to the Police Academy;

 Sri Lanka Police College and its Regional Training Institutes
 Regional In-Service Training Institutes
 Training Institute of the Police Traffic Headquarters
 Training Institute of Police Information Technology Division
 Training Institute of the Crime Division
 Training Institute of the Police Narcotics Bureau

References

External links
 National Police Academy  

Sri Lanka Police units
Colleges in Sri Lanka
Education in Western Province, Sri Lanka
Police academies